Assi Baldout is a former Israeli footballer who now works as the assistant manager of Bnei Yehuda.

Honours
Liga Leumit:
Winner (1): 2014–15
Runner-up (1): 2001–02
Israel State Cup:
Runner-up (1): 2006

External links
Player profile – Bnei Yehuda's website
Profile and statistics of Assi Baldout on One.co.il

1981 births
Israeli Jews
Living people
Israeli footballers
Bnei Yehuda Tel Aviv F.C. players
Hapoel Haifa F.C. players
Hapoel Rishon LeZion F.C. players
Hapoel Nir Ramat HaSharon F.C. players
Hapoel Ra'anana A.F.C. players
Hapoel Kfar Shalem F.C. players
Israeli Premier League players
Liga Leumit players
Footballers from Tel Aviv
Association football midfielders